Minoa Pediada ("Minoan Plain") is a municipality in Heraklion regional unit, Crete, Greece. The seat of the municipality is the village Evangelismos.

Municipality
The municipality Minoa Pediada was formed at the 2011 local government reform by the merger of the following 3 former municipalities, that became municipal units:
Arkalochori
Kastelli
Thrapsano

References

Municipalities of Crete
Populated places in Heraklion (regional unit)